Shoo, Minda and Nye are the three constituent dialects of a Jukunoid language of Nigeria which has no unitary name.

References

Jukunoid languages
Languages of Nigeria
Languages of Cameroon